Saint-Loup is a commune in the Creuse department in central France.

Geography
The Voueize forms part of the commune's western border.

Population

See also
Communes of the Creuse department

References

Communes of Creuse